Marouane Soussi (born 21 June 1988) is a Tunisian handball player for Sakiet Ezzit and the Tunisian national team.

He participated at the 2017 World Men's Handball Championship.

References

1988 births
Living people
Tunisian male handball players